Shakir al Khafaji (born 1955) is a Detroit-based Iraqi-American businessman.

References

 Dawson Bell and Tamara Audi, Detroit Free Press, April 24, 2004, "Role of Detroit area man questioned in U.N. scandal"
 Lionel Barber, Claudio Gatti and Mark Turner, Financial Times, April 13, 2004, "Money questions surround former UN weapons inspector's film: Arms expert's documentary was backed by financier who profited from the controversial oil-for-food programme for Iraq"
  Robert L. Pollock, Wall Street Journal, March 15, 2004, "Saddam's Useful Idiots"
 Duelfer Report Annex B

1955 births
Living people
American businesspeople
Iraqi emigrants to the United States
Iraqi businesspeople
American Shia Muslims
Iraqi Shia Muslims